A Full Spoon of Seedy Blues is the fourth album by the American garage rock band, the Seeds, credited to the Sky Saxon Blues Band, and released on GNP Crescendo in November 1967 (see 1967 in music). The album saw the group take a completely different and controversial direction from the psychedelia featured on their previous effort, Future, towards a style rooted in blues. However, the results of the venture were ill-received, both commercially and within their loyal fanbase.

Recording sessions actually began while the Seeds were completing their second album, A Web of Sound, but a release was postponed as the group was still enjoying commercial success from their debut album, which was issued in April 1966. A Full Spoon of Seedy Blues saw members of Muddy Waters' band, which included harmonica player George "Harmonica" Smith, saxophonist James Wells Gordon, and guitarists Luther Johnson and Mark Arnold. Additionally, Johnson contributed the two compositions, "Pretty Girl" and "One More Time Blues", and a cover version of the Waters-penned "Plain Spoken". Though the album was credited to the Sky Saxon Blues Band, there were no lineup changes from the personnel on their first three albums. The Seeds incidentally removed themselves from their hard-edge take on garage rock and psychedelia, replacing it with a relaxed blues sound. To that effect, A Full Spoon of Seedy Blues was the first and only Seeds album to not include a rendition of the guitar riff found in the group's hit song, "Pushin' Too Hard".

Upon release, A Full Spoon of Seedy Blues failed to chart on the Billboard 200 and damaged the band's image on a national scale, which marked a decline in their commercial success. The lack of album sales is mainly attributed to its blues-oriented material being released in a year when psychedelic music was at the peak of its popularity. The album has yet to see its own individual compact disc reissue and its contents are rarely available on compilation albums, but it was re-released with the Seeds' third album, Future, on June 12, 2001. In 2013, in order to flesh out more tracks, Big Beat Records' distribution of A Web of Sound included a mono mix of A Full Spoon of Seedy Blues.

Track listing

Side one
"Pretty Girl" (Luther Johnson) - 1:58
"Moth and the Flame" (Sky Saxon) - 3:47
"I'll Help You (Carry Your Money to the Bank)" (Saxon) - 3:27
"Cry Wolf" (Saxon) - 6:04
"Plain Spoken" (Muddy Waters) - 2:52

Side two
"The Gardener" (Saxon) - 4:57
"One More Time Blues" (Johnson) - 2:25
"Creepin' About" (Saxon) - 2:43
"Buzzin' Around" (Saxon) - 3:43

Personnel

 Sky Saxon - lead vocals, bass guitar, harmonica
 Jan Savage - lead guitar, gong, backing vocals
 Harvey Sharpe - bass guitar
 Daryl Hooper - organ, piano
 Rick Andridge - drums, backing vocals
  Luther Johnson - guitar
 Mark Arnold - guitar
 George "Harmonica" Smith - harmonica
 James Wells Gordon - saxophone

References

1967 albums
The Seeds albums
GNP Crescendo Records albums